K275CH (102.9 MHz) is a commercial FM radio station translator licensed to Gresham, Oregon, and broadcasting to the Portland metropolitan area. The station, billed as "WE 102.9," airs a rhythmic contemporary radio format, owned and operated by Alpha Media, which owns five of its own radio stations in the Portland market.

K275CH's studios and offices are in the Alpha Broadcast Center on South Fifth Avenue in Portland.  The transmitter is located off Southwest Fairmount Boulevard, amid other Portland-area FM and TV towers.  K275CH broadcasts at only 99 watts while many Portland-area FM stations operate at 100,000 watts.  Because the tower is 198 meters (650 feet) height above average terrain, a bit less than the Empire State Building, the station's signal is limited over Portland and its nearby suburbs in Oregon and Washington.

History
K275CH signed on at 102.5 FM in 1994, and repeated religious programming from the K-Love network. It would later shift to 102.7 FM in 2001. In 2014, Alpha began programming the translator and flipped it to a simulcast of KXTG; the following year, the translator would shift frequencies again to 102.9 FM.

The "WE" intellectual property began on August 1, 2016, at 5 p.m., when Alpha Media began operating KWLZ-FM (96.3 FM) under a Local Marketing Agreement with 3 Horizons, and flipped the station's format to Rhythmic CHR, branded as "WE 96-3". The station changed its call sign to KWEE on August 12, 2016.

On June 4, 2019, 3 Horizons LLC sold KWEE to WAY-FM Network, whose Christian AC programming was also heard on K283BL via iHeartMedia’s KFBW-HD2. The sale also ended its LMA with Alpha Media, as WAY-FM moved the Christian AC format to KWEE on October 3, 2019.

On September 16, 2019, Alpha began transitioning KWEE's format to 102.9, replacing the KXTG simulcast, relaunching as "WE 102.9." The transition was completed on October 3.

References

External links

Radio stations established in 1998
275CH
Rhythmic contemporary radio stations in the United States